Bystrytsia of Nadvirna is a river in Ivano-Frankivsk Oblast of western Ukraine. It joins the Bystrytsia of Solotvyn just north of Ivano-Frankivsk creating the Bystrytsia River.

It originates on the northern slopes of Black Kleva mountain (Gorgany mountain massif).

There are two cities located on the river: Nadvirna and Ivano-Frankivsk. The river has some tributary rivers: Salatruk (left); Dovzhynets, Zelenytsia, Vorona (all on the right).

External links

 Bystrytsia of Nadvirna at Encyclopedia of Ukraine.

Rivers of Ivano-Frankivsk Oblast